Tentaoculus georgianus is a species of small sea snail, a marine gastropod mollusk in the family Pseudococculinidae, the false limpets.

Distribution
This marine species occurs in the Atlantic Ocean off Georgia, USA.

Description 
The maximum recorded shell length is 3.5 mm.

Habitat 
Minimum recorded depth is 805 m. Maximum recorded depth is 805 m.

References

External links

Pseudococculinidae
Gastropods described in 1927